Bertine B. Pinckney (April 26, 1824December 26, 1909) was an American farmer, surveyor, and politician.  He served in the Wisconsin State Senate and Assembly, representing Fond du Lac County, and later served in the Kansas House of Representatives.  During the American Civil War, he served as a Union Army officer and was colonel of the 20th Wisconsin Infantry Regiment until suffering a stroke in December 1862.  His last name is often spelled Pinkney.

Biography

Born in New York City, he moved to Rosendale, Wisconsin Territory, in 1847.  He was a member of the Wisconsin State Assembly in 1850, representing Fond du Lac County's western Assembly district.  In 1851, he was elected to represent the 4th State Senate district in 1852, and was redistricted that year to the 20th Senate district, where he served for 1853. He was originally a member of the Whig Party, but joined the Democratic Party after the 1852 election, and joined the Republican Party when it was organized in 1854.

During the American Civil War, Pinckney enlisted in the 3rd Wisconsin Volunteer Infantry Regiment was appointed major. Then in 1862, he was commissioned colonel in the 20th Wisconsin Volunteer Infantry Regiment. Pinckney suffered a stroke and had to resign his commission. In 1864, he served as mayor of Ripon, Wisconsin.

Pinckney moved to Peabody, Kansas, in 1871. In 1875, Pinckley served as a Republican in the Kansas House of Representatives as a representative of Marion County, and starting in 1877 was the postmaster of Peabody, Kansas. He died in Peabody and is buried at Prairie Lawn Cemetery there.

References

Further reading
 Portrait and Biographical Record of Dickinson, Saline, McPherson, and Marion Counties, Kansas; Chapman Bros; 614 pages; 1893.  See biography of Bertine on pages 415 to 417.

External links
  because "Col. 20 Wis Inf." on tombstone. 
 The Mayors Page: Ripon-History 
 Bertine Pinckney of Kansas House of Representatives in 1874.

|-

|-

Mayors of places in Wisconsin
Wisconsin state senators
Members of the Wisconsin State Assembly
Members of the Kansas House of Representatives
Wisconsin Whigs
19th-century American politicians
1824 births
1909 deaths
Politicians from New York City
People from Peabody, Kansas
People from Rosendale, Wisconsin
People of Wisconsin in the American Civil War
People from Ripon, Wisconsin
Kansas Republicans
Kansas postmasters